Yang Guoyuan (born 7 April 1997) is a Chinese footballer currently playing as a midfielder for Heilongjiang Ice City.

Club career
Yang Guoyuan was promoted to the senior team of Henan Jianye within the 2018 Chinese Super League season but would have to wait until 3 March 2019 to make his debut in a league game against Dalian Yifang F.C. in a 1-1 draw where he came on as a substitute for Liu Heng.

Career statistics

References

External links

1997 births
Living people
Chinese footballers
Association football midfielders
Chinese Super League players
Henan Songshan Longmen F.C. players